Roger Morris may refer to:
Roger Morris (1695-1749), British architect
Roger Morris (British Army officer) (1727–1794)
Roger Morris (engineer) (1933–2001)
Roger Morris (American writer) (born 1938), historian and author of several books on Nixon, Kissinger, Haig, and the Clintons
Roger Morris (English writer) (born 1960), 2000s novelist
Roger Morris (bishop) (born 1968), current bishop of Colchester

See also
Roger Morrice, English minister and journalist